The Saturn Award for Best Production Design is one of the annual awards given by the American professional organization, the Academy of Science Fiction, Fantasy & Horror Films. The Saturn Awards, which are the oldest film-specialized awards to reward science fiction, fantasy, and horror achievements (the Hugo Award for Best Dramatic Presentation, awarded by the World Science Fiction Society who reward science fiction and fantasy in various media, is the oldest award for science fiction and fantasy films), included the Best Production Design category for the first time for the 2009 film year.

Winners and nominees

Multiple nominations
5 nominations
 Rick Heinrichs
4 nominations
 Rick Carter
 Robert Stromberg
3 nominations
 Stuart Craig
 Sarah Greenwood
 Charles Wood
2 nominations
 Scott Chambliss
 James Chinlund
 Nathan Crowley
 Guy Hendrix Dyas
 Dante Ferretti
 Dennis Gassner
 Darren Gilford
 Dan Hennah

Multiple wins
2 wins
 Rick Carter
 Dan Hennah
 Robert Stromberg

External links
 Official Saturn Awards website

Production Design, Saturn Award for Best